In Newtonian mechanics, momentum (more specifically linear momentum or translational momentum) is the product of the mass and velocity of an object. It is a vector quantity, possessing a magnitude and a direction.

In the International System of Units (SI), the unit of measurement of momentum is the kilogram metre per second (kg⋅m/s), which is equivalent to the newton-second.

Newton's second law of motion states that the rate of change of a body's momentum is equal to the net force acting on it. Momentum depends on the frame of reference, but in any inertial frame it is a conserved quantity, meaning that if a closed system is not affected by external forces, its total linear momentum does not change. Momentum is also conserved in special relativity (with a modified formula) and, in a modified form,  in electrodynamics, quantum mechanics, quantum field theory, and general relativity. It is an expression of one of the fundamental symmetries of space and time: translational symmetry.

Advanced formulations of classical mechanics, Lagrangian and Hamiltonian mechanics, allow one to choose coordinate systems that incorporate symmetries and constraints. In these systems the conserved quantity is  generalized momentum, and in general this is different from the kinetic momentum defined above. The concept of generalized momentum is carried over into quantum mechanics, where it becomes an operator on a wave function. The momentum and position operators are related by the Heisenberg uncertainty principle.

In continuous systems such as electromagnetic fields, fluid dynamics and deformable bodies, a momentum density can be defined, and a continuum version of the conservation of momentum leads to equations such as the Navier–Stokes equations for fluids or the Cauchy momentum equation for deformable solids or fluids.

Newtonian

Momentum is a vector quantity: it has both magnitude and direction. Since momentum has a direction, it can be used to predict the resulting direction and speed of motion of objects after they collide. Below, the basic properties of momentum are described in one dimension. The vector equations are almost identical to the scalar equations (see multiple dimensions).

Single particle
The momentum of a particle is conventionally represented by the letter . It is the product of two quantities, the particle's mass (represented by the letter ) and its velocity:

The unit of momentum is the product of the units of mass and velocity. In SI units, if the mass is in kilograms and the velocity is in meters per second then the momentum is in kilogram meters per second (kg⋅m/s). In cgs units, if the mass is in grams and the velocity in centimeters per second, then the momentum is in gram centimeters per second (g⋅cm/s).

Being a vector, momentum has magnitude and direction. For example, a 1 kg model airplane, traveling due north at 1 m/s in straight and level flight, has a momentum of 1 kg⋅m/s due north measured with reference to the ground.

Many particles
The momentum of a system of particles is the vector sum of their momenta.

The momenta of more than two particles can be added more generally with the following:

A system of particles has a center of mass, a point determined by the weighted sum of their positions:

If one or more of the particles is moving, the center of mass of the system will generally be moving as well (unless the system is in pure rotation around it).

This is known as Euler's first law.

Relation to force

If the net force  applied to a particle is constant, and is applied for a time interval , the momentum of the particle changes by an amount

In differential form, this is Newton's second law; the rate of change of the momentum of a particle is equal to the instantaneous force  acting on it,

Impulse is measured in the derived units of the newton second (1 N⋅s = 1 kg⋅m/s) or dyne second (1 dyne⋅s = 1 g⋅cm/s)

Under the assumption of constant mass , it is equivalent to write

hence the net force is equal to the mass of the particle times its acceleration.

Example: A model airplane of mass 1 kg accelerates from rest to a velocity of 6 m/s due north in 2 s. The net force required to produce this acceleration is 3 newtons due north. The change in momentum is 6 kg⋅m/s due north. The rate of change of momentum is 3 (kg⋅m/s)/s due north which is numerically equivalent to 3 newtons.

Conservation
In a closed system (one that does not exchange any matter with its surroundings and is not acted on by external forces) the total momentum remains constant. This fact, known as the law of conservation of momentum, is implied by Newton's laws of motion. Suppose, for example, that two particles interact. As explained by the third law, the forces between them are equal in magnitude but opposite in direction. Therefore,

with the negative sign indicating that the forces oppose. Equivalently,

This law holds no matter how complicated the force is between particles. Similarly, if there are several particles, the momentum exchanged between each pair of particles adds to zero, so the total change in momentum is zero. This conservation law applies to all interactions, including collisions (both elastic and inelastic) and separations caused by explosive forces. It can also be generalized to situations where Newton's laws do not hold, for example in the theory of relativity and in electrodynamics.

Dependence on reference frame
Momentum is a measurable quantity, and the measurement depends on the frame of reference. For example: if an aircraft of mass 1000 kg is flying through the air at a speed of 50 m/s its momentum can be calculated to be 50,000 kg.m/s. If the aircraft is flying into a headwind of 5 m/s its speed relative to the surface of the Earth is only 45 m/s and its momentum can be calculated to be 45,000 kg.m/s. Both calculations are equally correct. In both frames of reference, any change in momentum will be found to be consistent with the relevant laws of physics.

Suppose   is a position in an inertial frame of reference. From the point of view of another frame of reference, moving at a constant speed  relative to the other, the position (represented by a primed coordinate) changes with time as

This is called a Galilean transformation.

If a particle is moving at speed  in the first frame of reference, in the second, it is moving at speed

Since  does not change, the second reference frame is also an inertial frame and the accelerations are the same:

Thus, momentum is conserved in both reference frames. Moreover, as long as the force has the same form, in both frames, Newton's second law is unchanged. Forces such as Newtonian gravity, which depend only on the scalar distance between objects, satisfy this criterion. This independence of reference frame is called Newtonian relativity or Galilean invariance.

A change of reference frame, can, often, simplify calculations of motion. For example, in a collision of two particles, a reference frame can be chosen, where, one particle begins at rest. Another, commonly used reference frame, is the center of mass frame – one that is moving with the center of mass. In this frame,
the total momentum is zero.

Application to collisions
If two particles, each of known momentum, collide and coalesce, the law of conservation of momentum can be used to determine the momentum of the coalesced body. If the outcome of the collision is that the two particles separate, the law is not sufficient to determine the momentum of each particle. If the momentum of one particle after the collision is known, the law can be used to determine the momentum of the other particle. Alternatively if the combined kinetic energy after the collision is known, the law can be used to determine the momentum of each particle after the collision. Kinetic energy is usually not conserved. If it is conserved, the collision is called an elastic collision; if not, it is an inelastic collision.

Elastic collisions

An elastic collision is one in which no kinetic energy is transformed into heat or some other form of energy. Perfectly elastic collisions can occur when the objects do not touch each other, as for example in atomic or nuclear scattering where electric repulsion keeps the objects apart. A slingshot maneuver of a satellite around a planet can also be viewed as a perfectly elastic collision. A collision between two pool balls is a good example of an almost totally elastic collision, due to their high rigidity, but when bodies come in contact there is always some dissipation.

A head-on elastic collision between two bodies can be represented by velocities in one dimension, along a line passing through the bodies.

A change of reference frame can simplify analysis of a collision. For example, suppose there are two bodies of equal mass , one stationary and one approaching the other at a speed  (as in the figure). The center of mass is moving at speed  and both bodies are moving towards it at speed . Because of the symmetry, after the collision both must be moving away from the center of mass at the same speed. Adding the speed of the center of mass to both, we find that the body that was moving is now stopped and the other is moving away at speed . The bodies have exchanged their velocities. Regardless of the velocities of the bodies, a switch to the center of mass frame leads us to the same conclusion. Therefore, the final velocities are given by

In general, when the initial velocities are known, the final velocities are given by

If one body has much greater mass than the other, its velocity will be little affected by a collision while the other body will experience a large change.

Inelastic collisions

In an inelastic collision, some of the kinetic energy of the colliding bodies is converted into other forms of energy (such as heat or sound). Examples include traffic collisions, in which the effect of loss of kinetic energy can be seen in the damage to the vehicles; electrons losing some of their energy to atoms (as in the Franck–Hertz experiment); and particle accelerators in which the kinetic energy is converted into mass in the form of new particles.

In a perfectly inelastic collision (such as a bug hitting a windshield), both bodies have the same motion afterwards. A head-on inelastic collision between two bodies can be represented by velocities in one dimension, along a line passing through the bodies. The equation expressing conservation of momentum is:

If one body is motionless to begin with (e.g. ), the equation for conservation of momentum is

so

In a different situation, if the frame of reference is moving at the final velocity such that , the objects would be brought to rest by a perfectly inelastic collision and 100% of the kinetic energy is converted to other forms of energy. In this instance the initial velocities of the bodies would be non-zero, or the bodies would have to be massless.

One measure of the inelasticity of the collision is the coefficient of restitution , defined as the ratio of relative velocity of separation to relative velocity of approach. In applying this measure to a ball bouncing from a solid surface, this can be easily measured using the following formula:

The momentum and energy equations also apply to the motions of objects that begin together and then move apart. For example, an explosion is the result of a chain reaction that transforms potential energy stored in chemical, mechanical, or nuclear form into kinetic energy, acoustic energy, and electromagnetic radiation. Rockets also make use of conservation of momentum: propellant is thrust outward, gaining momentum, and an equal and opposite momentum is imparted to the rocket.

Multiple dimensions

Real motion has both direction and velocity and must be represented by a vector. In a coordinate system with  axes, velocity has components  in the -direction,  in the -direction,  in the -direction. The vector is represented by a boldface symbol:

Similarly, the momentum is a vector quantity and is represented by a boldface symbol:

Each vector equation represents three scalar equations. For example,

represents three equations:

The kinetic energy equations are exceptions to the above replacement rule. The equations are still one-dimensional, but each scalar represents the magnitude of the vector, for example,

Each vector equation represents three scalar equations. Often coordinates can be chosen so that only two components are needed, as in the figure. Each component can be obtained separately and the results combined to produce a vector result.

A simple construction involving the center of mass frame can be used to show that if a stationary elastic sphere is struck by a moving sphere, the two will head off at right angles after the collision (as in the figure).

Objects of variable mass 

The concept of momentum plays a fundamental role in explaining the behavior of variable-mass objects such as a rocket ejecting fuel or a star accreting gas. In analyzing such an object, one treats the object's mass as a function that varies with time: . The momentum of the object at time  is therefore .

 (incorrect)
This equation does not correctly describe the motion of variable-mass objects. The correct equation is

where  is the velocity of the ejected/accreted mass as seen in the object's rest frame.

This equation is derived by keeping track of both the momentum of the object as well as the momentum of the ejected/accreted mass (dm). When considered together, the object and the mass (dm) constitute a closed system in which total momentum is conserved.

Relativistic

Lorentz invariance
Newtonian physics assumes that absolute time and space exist outside of any observer; this gives rise to Galilean invariance. It also results in a prediction that the speed of light can vary from one reference frame to another. This is contrary to observation. In the special theory of relativity, Einstein keeps the postulate that the equations of motion do not depend on the reference frame, but assumes that the speed of light  is invariant. As a result, position and time in two reference frames are related by the Lorentz transformation instead of the Galilean transformation.

Consider, for example, one reference frame moving relative to another at velocity  in the  direction. The Galilean transformation gives the coordinates of the moving frame as

while the Lorentz transformation gives

where  is the Lorentz factor:

Newton's second law, with mass fixed, is not invariant under a Lorentz transformation. However, it can be made invariant by making the inertial mass  of an object a function of velocity:

 is the object's invariant mass.

The modified momentum,

obeys Newton's second law:

Four-vector formulation

In the theory of special relativity, physical quantities are expressed in terms of four-vectors that include time as a fourth coordinate along with the three space coordinates. These vectors are generally represented by capital letters, for example  for position. The expression for the four-momentum depends on how the coordinates are expressed. Time may be given in its normal units or multiplied by the speed of light so that all the components of the four-vector have dimensions of length. If the latter scaling is used, an interval of proper time, defined by

is invariant under Lorentz transformations (in this expression and in what follows the  metric signature has been used, different authors use different conventions).

In all the coordinate systems, the (contravariant) relativistic four-velocity is defined by

and the (contravariant) four-momentum is

where  is the invariant mass. If  (in Minkowski space), then

Using Einstein's mass-energy equivalence, this can be rewritten as

Thus, conservation of four-momentum is Lorentz-invariant and implies conservation of both mass and energy.

The magnitude of the momentum four-vector is equal to :

and is invariant across all reference frames.

The relativistic energy–momentum relationship holds even for massless particles such as photons; by setting  it follows that

In a game of relativistic "billiards", if a stationary particle is hit by a moving particle in an elastic collision, the paths formed by the two afterwards will form an acute angle. This is unlike the non-relativistic case where they travel at right angles.

The four-momentum of a planar wave can be related to a wave four-vector

For a particle, the relationship between temporal components, is the Planck–Einstein relation, and the relation between spatial components, describes a de Broglie matter wave.

Generalized

Newton's laws can be difficult to apply to many kinds of motion because the motion is limited by constraints. For example, a bead on an abacus is constrained to move along its wire and a pendulum bob is constrained to swing at a fixed distance from the pivot. Many such constraints can be incorporated by changing the normal Cartesian coordinates to a set of generalized coordinates that may be fewer in number. Refined mathematical methods have been developed for solving mechanics problems in generalized coordinates. They introduce a generalized momentum, also known as the canonical or conjugate momentum, that extends the concepts of both linear momentum and angular momentum. To distinguish it from generalized momentum, the product of mass and velocity is also referred to as mechanical, kinetic or kinematic momentum. The two main methods are described below.

Lagrangian mechanics
In Lagrangian mechanics, a Lagrangian is defined as the difference between the kinetic energy  and the potential energy :

If the generalized coordinates are represented as a vector  and time differentiation is represented by a dot over the variable, then the equations of motion (known as the Lagrange or Euler–Lagrange equations) are a set of  equations:

If a coordinate  is not a Cartesian coordinate, the associated generalized momentum component  does not necessarily have the dimensions of linear momentum. Even if  is a Cartesian coordinate,  will not be the same as the mechanical momentum if the potential depends on velocity.  Some sources represent the kinematic momentum by the symbol .

In this mathematical framework, a generalized momentum is associated with the generalized coordinates. Its components are defined as

Each component  is said to be the conjugate momentum for the coordinate .

Now if a given coordinate  does not appear in the Lagrangian (although its time derivative might appear), then

This is the generalization of the conservation of momentum.

Even if the generalized coordinates are just the ordinary spatial coordinates, the conjugate momenta are not necessarily the ordinary momentum coordinates. An example is found in the section on electromagnetism.

Hamiltonian mechanics
In Hamiltonian mechanics, the Lagrangian (a function of generalized coordinates and their derivatives) is replaced by a Hamiltonian that is a function of generalized coordinates and momentum. The Hamiltonian is defined as

where the momentum is obtained by differentiating the Lagrangian as above. The Hamiltonian equations of motion are

As in Lagrangian mechanics, if a generalized coordinate does not appear in the Hamiltonian, its conjugate momentum component is conserved.

Symmetry and conservation
Conservation of momentum is a mathematical consequence of the homogeneity (shift symmetry) of space (position in space is the canonical conjugate quantity to momentum). That is, conservation of momentum is a consequence of the fact that the laws of physics do not depend on position; this is a special case of Noether's theorem. For systems that do not have this symmetry, it may not be possible to define conservation of momentum. Examples where conservation of momentum does not apply include curved spacetimes in general relativity or time crystals in condensed matter physics.

Electromagnetic

Particle in a field

In Maxwell's equations, the forces between particles are mediated by electric and magnetic fields. The electromagnetic force (Lorentz force) on a particle with charge  due to a combination of electric field  and magnetic field  is

(in SI units).
It has an electric potential  and magnetic vector potential .
In the non-relativistic regime, its generalized momentum is

while in relativistic mechanics this becomes

The quantity  is sometimes called the potential momentum. It is the momentum due to the interaction of the particle with the electromagnetic fields. The name is an analogy with the potential energy , which is the energy due to the interaction of the particle with the electromagnetic fields. These quantities form a four-vector, so the analogy is consistent; besides, the concept of potential momentum is important in explaining the so-called hidden-momentum of the electromagnetic fields

Conservation
In Newtonian mechanics, the law of conservation of momentum can be derived from the law of action and reaction, which states that every force has a reciprocating equal and opposite force. Under some circumstances, moving charged particles can exert forces on each other in non-opposite directions. Nevertheless, the combined momentum of the particles and the electromagnetic field is conserved.

Vacuum
The Lorentz force imparts a momentum to the particle, so by Newton's second law the particle must impart a momentum to the electromagnetic fields.

In a vacuum, the momentum per unit volume is

The momentum density is proportional to the Poynting vector  which gives the directional rate of energy transfer per unit area:

If momentum is to be conserved over the volume  over a region , changes in the momentum of matter through the Lorentz force must be balanced by changes in the momentum of the electromagnetic field and outflow of momentum.

The electromagnetic momentum is

and the equation for conservation of each component  of the momentum is

The quantity  is called the Maxwell stress tensor, defined as

Media
The above results are for the microscopic Maxwell equations, applicable to electromagnetic forces in a vacuum (or on a very small scale in media). It is more difficult to define momentum density in media because the division into electromagnetic and mechanical is arbitrary. The definition of electromagnetic momentum density is modified to

where the H-field  is related to the B-field and the magnetization  by

The electromagnetic stress tensor depends on the properties of the media.

Quantum mechanical

In quantum mechanics, momentum is defined as a self-adjoint operator on the wave function. The Heisenberg uncertainty principle defines limits on how accurately the momentum and position of a single observable system can be known at once. In quantum mechanics, position and momentum are conjugate variables.

For a single particle described in the position basis the momentum operator can be written as

This is a commonly encountered form of the momentum operator, though the momentum operator in other bases can take other forms. For example, in momentum space the momentum operator is represented as

where the operator  acting on a wave function  yields that wave function multiplied by the value , in an analogous fashion to the way that the position operator acting on a wave function  yields that wave function multiplied by the value x.

For both massive and massless objects, relativistic momentum is related to the phase constant    by

Electromagnetic radiation (including visible light, ultraviolet light, and radio waves) is carried by photons. Even though photons (the particle aspect of light) have no mass, they still carry momentum. This leads to applications such as the solar sail. The calculation of the momentum of light within dielectric media is somewhat controversial (see Abraham–Minkowski controversy).

In deformable bodies and fluids

Conservation in a continuum

In fields such as fluid dynamics and solid mechanics, it is not feasible to follow the motion of individual atoms or molecules. Instead, the materials must be approximated by a continuum in which there is a particle or fluid parcel at each point that is assigned the average of the properties of atoms in a small region nearby. In particular, it has a density  and velocity  that depend on time  and position .

Consider a column of water in hydrostatic equilibrium. All the forces on the water are in balance and the water is motionless. On any given drop of water, two forces are balanced. The first is gravity, which acts directly on each atom and molecule inside. The second force is the sum of all the forces exerted on its surface by the surrounding water. The force from below is greater than the force from above by just the amount needed to balance gravity. The normal force per unit area is the pressure . The average force per unit volume inside the droplet is the gradient of the pressure, so the force balance equation is

If the forces are not balanced, the droplet accelerates. This acceleration is not simply the partial derivative  because the fluid in a given volume changes with time. Instead, the material derivative is needed:

Applied to any physical quantity, the material derivative includes the rate of change at a point and the changes due to advection as fluid is carried past the point. This is equal to the net force on the droplet.

Forces that can change the momentum of a droplet include the gradient of the pressure and gravity, as above. In addition, surface forces can deform the droplet. In the simplest case, a shear stress , exerted by a force parallel to the surface of the droplet, is proportional to the rate of deformation or strain rate. Such a shear stress occurs if the fluid has a velocity gradient because the fluid is moving faster on one side than another.

where  is the viscosity. This is also a flux, or flow per unit area, of x-momentum through the surface.

Including the effect of viscosity, the momentum balance equations for the incompressible flow of a Newtonian fluid are

These are known as the Navier–Stokes equations.

The momentum balance equations can be extended to more general materials, including solids. For each surface with normal in direction  and force in direction , there is a stress component . The nine components make up the Cauchy stress tensor , which includes both pressure and shear. The local conservation of momentum is expressed by the Cauchy momentum equation:

where  is the body force.

The Cauchy momentum equation is broadly applicable to deformations of solids and liquids. The relationship between the stresses and the strain rate depends on the properties of the material (see Types of viscosity).

Acoustic waves

A disturbance in a medium gives rise to oscillations, or waves, that propagate away from their source. In a fluid, small changes in pressure  can often be described by the acoustic wave equation:

where  is the speed of sound. In a solid, similar equations can be obtained for propagation of pressure (P-waves) and shear (S-waves).

In the linear approximation that leads to the above acoustic equation, the time average of this flux is zero. However, nonlinear effects can give rise to a nonzero average. It is possible for momentum flux to occur even though the wave itself does not have a mean momentum.

History of the concept

In about 530 AD, John Philoponus developed a concept of momentum in On Physics, a commentary to Aristotle's Physics. Aristotle claimed that everything that is moving must be kept moving by something. For example, a thrown ball must be kept moving by motions of the air. Philoponus pointed out the absurdity in Aristotle's claim that motion of an object is promoted by the same air that is resisting its passage. He proposed instead that an impetus was imparted to the object in the act of throwing it.

In 1020, Ibn Sīnā (also known by his Latinized name Avicenna) read Philoponus and published his own theory of motion in The Book of Healing. He agreed that an impetus is imparted to a projectile by the thrower; but unlike Philoponus, who believed that it was a temporary virtue that would decline even in a vacuum, he viewed it as a persistent, requiring external forces such as air resistance to dissipate it.

In the 13th and 14th century, Peter Olivi and Jean Buridan read and refined the work of Philoponus, and possibly that of Ibn Sīnā. Buridan, who in about 1350 was made rector of the University of Paris, referred to impetus being proportional to the weight times the speed. Moreover, Buridan's theory was different from his predecessor's in that he did not consider impetus to be self-dissipating, asserting that a body would be arrested by the forces of air resistance and gravity which might be opposing its impetus.

In 1644, René Descartes, in Principia Philosophiæ, believed that the total "quantity of motion" in the universe is conserved, where the quantity of motion is understood as the product of size and speed. This should not be read as a statement of the modern law of momentum, since he had no concept of mass as distinct from weight and size, and more important, he believed that it is speed rather than velocity that is conserved. So for Descartes if a moving object were to bounce off a surface, changing its direction but not its speed, there would be no change in its quantity of motion.  Galileo, in his Two New Sciences, used the Italian word impeto to similarly describe Descartes's quantity of motion.

In 1686, Gottfried Wilhelm Leibniz, in Discourse on Metaphysics, gave an argument against Descartes' construction of the conservation of the "quantity of motion" using an example of dropping blocks of different sizes different distances.  He points out that force is conserved but quantity of motion, construed as the product of size and speed of an object, is not conserved.

In the 1600s, Christiaan Huygens concluded quite early that Descartes's laws for the elastic collision of two bodies must be wrong, and he formulated the correct laws. An important step was his recognition of the Galilean invariance of the problems. His views then took many years to be circulated. He passed them on in person to William Brouncker and Christopher Wren in London, in 1661. What Spinoza wrote to Henry Oldenburg about them, in 1666 which was during the Second Anglo-Dutch War, was guarded. Huygens had actually worked them out in a manuscript De motu corporum ex percussione in the period 1652–6. The war ended in 1667, and Huygens announced his results to the Royal Society in 1668. He published them in the Journal des sçavans in 1669.

In 1670, John Wallis, in Mechanica sive De Motu, Tractatus Geometricus, stated the law of conservation of momentum: "the initial state of the body, either of rest or of motion, will persist" and "If the force is greater than the resistance, motion will result". Wallis used momentum for quantity of motion, and vis for force.

In 1687, Isaac Newton, in Philosophiæ Naturalis Principia Mathematica, just like Wallis, showed a similar casting around for words to use for the mathematical momentum. His Definition II defines quantitas motus, "quantity of motion", as "arising from the velocity and quantity of matter conjointly", which identifies it as momentum. Thus when in Law II he refers to mutatio motus, "change of motion", being proportional to the force impressed, he is generally taken to mean momentum and not motion.

In 1721, John Jennings published Miscellanea, where the momentum in its current mathematical sense is attested, five years before the final edition of Newton's Principia Mathematica.

In 1728, the Cyclopedia states:

See also

 Angular momentum
 Crystal momentum
 Galilean cannon
 Momentum compaction
 Momentum transfer
 Newton's cradle
 Planck momentum
 Position and momentum space

References

Bibliography

External links

Conservation of momentum – A chapter from an online textbook

Conservation laws
Mechanics
Moment (physics)
 
Motion (physics)
Vector physical quantities